Lespesses is a commune in the Pas-de-Calais department in the Hauts-de-France region of France.

Geography
The commune is separated into two parts by the A26 autoroute.

Population

Places of interest
 The church of St. Martin, dating from the sixteenth century.

See also
Communes of the Pas-de-Calais department

References

Communes of Pas-de-Calais